John Tyrrell (1646–1692) of Oakley, Buckinghamshire, son of Sir Timothy Tyrrell and Dame Elizabeth, his wife, was made by Charles II of England the Second Admiral in the East Indies.

John Tyrrell served in the Restoration navy, including a long period as a lieutenant. On 24 October 1665, he was appointed the lieutenant of the third rate Resolution. In 1672, he was appointed lieutenant of the fourth rate Leopard, becoming her temporary commander on 28 May 1673 following the death of her captain, Peter Bowen. In September 1674, the King appointed him lieutenant of the fourth rate Dragon. Finally, on 16 January 1678, the King appointed him as captain of the sixth rate Drake. On 3 April 1680, he was given command of the prize Orange Tree. On 13 April 1682, he was reappointed to command the Orange Tree. On 18 April, he was switched to the Mermaid. On 23 February 1684, he was appointed to command the Oxford. On 1 June 1684, the King appointed John Tyrrell to command the Phoenix of 42 guns. On 19 September 1685, he caught and sank a "Zanganian" pirate ship in an action notable for the boarding and survival of the then Lieutenant John Byng.

Then on 4 September 1688, he was appointed to command the Mordaunt (46 guns). He took part in the action on 4 October 1689, when a group of English cruisers fell in with 12 French warships, and the sixth rate Lively prize was lost. He commanded the third rate Anne (70 guns) when she was beached and burnt after the Battle of Beachy Head on 30 June 1690, "where he withstood the violence of the whole French navy". He had been assigned to the rear (blue) squadron. He fought at the Battle of Barfleur, where he commanded the second rate Ossory of 90 guns.

He died 6 December 1692, aged 46, and according to his memorial in Oakley he was "a true lover of his country, a valiant and skilful Commander".

Notes

References
William Laird Clowes, The Royal Navy: A History from the Earliest Times to the Present, Vol.II, 1898.
J.R. Tanner, A Descriptive Catalogue of the Naval Manuscripts in the Pepysian Library at Magdalene College, Cambridge, Vol.I, 1903.
Memorial tablets within Oakley Church.

Royal Navy officers
1646 births
1692 deaths